Wallace Buttrick was a Baptist minister who served as secretary (1903–1917), president (1917–1923), and chairman (1923–1926) of the General Education Board, and as a trustee of the Rockefeller Foundation (1917–1926). Wallace Buttrick believed that schools, teachers, and institutions were not necessary for education however, for those who were less fortunate this served as the only medium for learning. The academic and administrative building Buttrick Hall at Agnes Scott College is named in Buttrick's honor. He is cited as a friend of the college, the opening of Buttrick Hall was celebrated May 30 1930.

General Education Board 
Wallace Buttrick, Secretary of the GEB, played a significant role in not only funding the General Board of Education but as well the reason for education.

References

Education activists
Rockefeller Foundation people
Year of birth missing
Year of death missing
American philanthropists
Baptist ministers from the United States